Hundeshagen is a village and a former municipality in the district of Eichsfeld in Thuringia, Germany. Since July 2018, it is part of the town Leinefelde-Worbis.

References

External links
More about Hundeshagen (in German)

Eichsfeld (district)
Former municipalities in Thuringia